Robert Ferris Prince (July 1, 1916 – June 10, 1985) was an American radio and television sportscaster and commentator, best known for his 28-year stint as the voice of the Pittsburgh Pirates Major League Baseball club, with whom he earned the nickname "The Gunner" and became a cultural icon in Pittsburgh.

Prince was one of the most distinct and popular voices in sports broadcast history, known for his gravel voice, unabashed style and clever nicknames and phrases, which came to be known as "Gunnerisms." His unique manner influenced a number of broadcasters after him, including Pittsburgh Penguins voice Mike Lange and Pittsburgh Steelers color analyst Myron Cope.

Prince called Pirates games from 1948 to 1975, including the World Series championship years of 1960 and 1971. Nationally, he broadcast the 1960, 1966, and 1971 World Series and the 1965 All-Star Game for NBC, as well as the first year (1976) of ABC's Monday Night Baseball. He also broadcast at different times for other Pittsburgh-area sports teams, including Steelers football and Penguins hockey.

Early life and career
Born in Los Angeles, California, Prince's father was a former West Point football  player and a career military man. An Army brat, he attended many schools before graduating from Schenley High School in Pittsburgh. An athlete himself, he lettered in swimming at the University of Pittsburgh. Prince worked for radio station WJAS, then landed a sports show on KDKA-TV. He also broadcast Pittsburgh Steelers and Penn State football and once a Duquesne basketball game in the 1950s.

As a result of his distinct voice, knowledge of baseball, and high-profile persona, Prince was very popular among Pirates supporters. Prince was a fixture on team broadcasts for three decades on KDKA-AM, a clear channel radio station that could be heard throughout the eastern United States after sundown.

A regular smoker and social drinker, the fun-loving Prince jumped from the third floor of the Chase Hotel in St. Louis into a swimming pool in 1957, on a dare by Pirates third baseman Gene Freese.

The Possum and The Gunner
Many veteran observers believe Prince did his best work while paired with longtime sidekick Jim "The Possum" Woods and vice versa from 1958 through 1969, which coincided with the rise of the Pirates as a championship-caliber team. Indeed, it was roughly halfway through Woods's debut season when Prince—inspired by Pittsburgh's dramatically improved showing after nearly a decade mired deep in the National League's second division—first dubbed Forbes Field "The House of Thrills." It was Woods who first referred to Prince as "The Gunner." Some say this was because of his staccato, rapid-fire style, others claim it was the result of an incident with a jealous, gun-toting husband. Woods allegedly recounted to an interviewer in Cleveland that two decades ago, during Woods' first spring-training with the Pirates in Fort Myers, Florida (1958), Prince had had a narrow escape from an encounter with a jealous husband who was packing a gun.

To be sure, no one bled black and gold like Prince did before or since. Invariably, when his Buccos were trailing in the late innings by two runs, he'd say, "We need a bloop and a blast!" If calling for three runs, he would say, "We need a bleeder, a bloop and a blast!" His partisanship slipped over into Woods' style as well, and by the mid-'60s, The Possum would be announcing the presence of pinch-hitter (and reserve catcher) Jesse Gonder with, "Let's go up yonder with Jesse Gonder." (The two would continue working together through the  season, after which the flagship station KDKA refused to match a higher salary offer from KMOX in St. Louis for Woods to join Jack Buck in the Cardinals' booth; that partnership only lasted two seasons.) Prince was more of a rooter than a homer, in that he always showed respect to opponents and the game alike. Like the vast majority of broadcasters of his time, he rarely second-guessed players or managers. He was especially close friends with Milwaukee Braves pitchers Warren Spahn and Lew Burdette.

Prince would reunite with Woods on two separate occasions for the USA Network. The first was on July 26, 1979 for a game between the Pirates and Cincinnati Reds in Pittsburgh. The second occasion was on August 28, 1980 for another Pirates game in Pittsburgh against the Reds.

"The Green Weenie"
In 1966, Prince popularized a good-luck charm known as the Green Weenie, a plastic rattle in the shape of an oversized green pickle that Pirates fans used to jinx opponents. "Never underestimate the power of the Green Weenie," he liked to assure listeners. At the height of the term's popularity in 1966, Prince often punctuated the last out of a Bucs' victory by exclaiming, "The Great Green Weenie has done it again!" The pin's shape and color is derived from the pickle-shaped pins distributed to schoolchildren when they toured the H. J. Heinz Company factory in Pittsburgh.

By late season, with the Pirates in a terrific pennant race with the Dodgers and Giants, some fans would parade a giant replica of the Green Weenie through the grandstand as a rally symbol. The hex symbol had started in the dugout with trainer Danny Whelan. Prince picked up on it and began talking about it on the broadcasts. No one thought to trademark the Green Weenie, so tens of thousands were sold in 1966, but Prince, Whelan, and the Pirates didn't profit from it.

Later career

Controversial departure from the Pirates
Soon after control of the broadcasts changed from Atlantic Richfield to Westinghouse Broadcasting in 1969, Prince had personal conflicts with Westinghouse management. Pirates management often interceded to quell tensions between Prince and KDKA executives. Finally, in 1975, inexplicably, Prince and sidekick Nellie King were fired, a decision that Pirates management did not try to reverse. Pirates fans were shocked by the news. Egged on by competing radio station WEEP, hundreds of supporters held a parade and downtown rally. Several Pirates players also went to bat for him, but rehiring Prince was never a consideration. KDKA hired Milo Hamilton in December and distributed press kits at a news conference that had a cover sticker proclaiming, "The New Voice of the Pirates." Hamilton was never popular with fans and while professional, never could compare with Prince’s charisma.

After his time with the Pirates, Prince had stints calling Houston Astros baseball, Pittsburgh Penguins hockey, and ABC's Monday Night Baseball. He was frustrated that ABC wouldn't let him employ his usual style, and was removed from the primary Monday night broadcast team during his first season before being dropped altogether after the season. He also was released by the Astros after a one-year stay; he later said that Houston didn't agree with him. His work with the Penguins was a cause of consternation for hockey fans because he didn't understand the game and didn't know the Penguins' personnel. Eventually he was taken off play-by-play and re-cast as an intermission interviewer.  Eventually, he returned to Pirate baseball, thrilling his loyal fans, in 1982, calling a limited number of Pirates games for a cable station.

May 3, 1985
Three years after his return, KDKA and the Pirates decided to make Prince a member of the regular radio broadcast team in 1985. Broadcaster Lanny Frattare suggested that KDKA should launch a campaign to have Prince recognized with the Hall of Fame's Ford Frick Award. At about the same time, independently, station executives Rick Starr and Chris Cross decided Prince should have a role on the radio broadcasts. The announcement came days after he had been released from a hospital for cancer treatments. Prince returned to the Pirates broadcast booth on May 3 to announce the middle three innings of the game between the Pirates and the Los Angeles Dodgers. Weakened from mouth cancer, Prince was able to announce only two innings but was given three standing ovations. The Pirates scored nine runs in the fourth, the first inning that Prince announced, one for each year of his absence from the booth.

Willie Stargell had retired three years earlier, and most of the 1979 championship team had disbanded. The fourth inning broadcast announced by Prince on May 3 was the fifth-most runs scored in any one inning (9) in Pirates franchise history. A commentator on KDKA-TV (Channel 2) referred to it on the 6 p.m. news as the "last revival of the Green Weenie," Prince's good luck charm from 1966. Prince announced a few following homestands. Weeks later, he reported to the park for another game, but his illness forced him to go home after waiting through a long rain delay. Prince was unable to report for work again and was re-admitted to the hospital, where he died at age 68 on June 10. His brief funeral service on June 16 was attended by seven hundred.

Honors and awards
He also was a 1986 inductee in the National Sportscasters and Sportswriters Association Hall of Fame.

Even today, his name remains synonymous with Pirates baseball including the naming of the new "Gunner's Lounge" at PNC Park in 2012. In 1999, Prince was selected for the Pride of the Pirates award, a lifetime achievement honor given annually to a member of the organization.

References

Further reading
 O'Brien, Jim. (1998). We Had 'Em All the Way: Bob Prince and His Pittsburgh Pirates. Pittsburgh, Pennsylvania: James P. O'Brien Publishing. .

External links

 Bob Prince Ford C. Frick Award biography at the National Baseball Hall of Fame
 
 

1916 births
1985 deaths
Deaths from cancer in Pennsylvania
College basketball announcers in the United States
Deaths from oral cancer
Ford C. Frick Award recipients
Houston Astros announcers
Major League Baseball broadcasters
National Football League announcers
National Hockey League broadcasters
Radio personalities from Los Angeles
Penn State Nittany Lions football announcers
Pittsburgh Panthers men's swimmers
Pittsburgh Penguins announcers
Pittsburgh Pirates announcers
Pittsburgh Steelers announcers
Radio personalities from Pittsburgh
Schenley High School alumni